The Panzergrenadier Division "Großdeutschland", also commonly referred to simply as Großdeutschland or Großdeutschland Division, was an elite combat unit of the German Army (Heer) that fought on the Eastern Front in World War II.

Originally formed in 1921 it was known as the Wachregiment Berlin and served as a ceremonial guard unit and by the 1939 had grown into a regiment of the combined Wehrmacht German armed forces. The regiment would later be expanded and renamed Infantry Division Großdeutschland in 1942, and after significant reorganization was renamed Panzergrenadier Division Großdeutschland in May 1943. In November 1944, while the division retained its status as a panzergrenadier division, some of its subordinate units were expanded to divisional status, and the whole group of divisions were reorganized as Panzerkorps Großdeutschland.

1939–1942
The Infantry Regiment Grossdeutschland was activated on 14 June 1939. The regiment saw action in France in 1940, and took part in the invasion of Yugoslavia in April 1941. It was attached to Panzer Group 2 in the opening phases of Barbarossa, and was nearly destroyed in the Battle of Moscow in late 1941. On the last day of February 1942, the remnants of the regiment absorbed two battalions of reinforcements that arrived from Neuruppin and the regiment was reconstituted. It later moved to Orel, and on 1 April 1942 the former Infantry Regiment Großdeutschland was reinforced and expanded into the Infanterie-Division Großdeutschland (mot.) (motorized Infantry Division Grossdeutschland) using newly arrived troops from Germany.

The division was assigned to XXXXVIII Panzer Corps during the opening phases of Fall Blau, the Wehrmacht's 1942 strategic summer offensive in southern Russia. During the combined Soviet winter offensives Operation Uranus and Operation Mars in late November through mid-December, the division fought near Rzhev, where it was rendered combat ineffective.

In January–February 1943, Großdeutschland and XXXXVIII Panzer Corps, along with the II SS Panzer Corps took part in the Third Battle of Kharkov. The division fought alongside the 1.SS Division Leibstandarte SS Adolf Hitler, 2. SS Division Das Reich and 3.SS Division Totenkopf during these battles. After the conquest of Kharkov, the Großdeutschland was again pulled back and refitted.

On 19 May 1943, with the addition of armoured personnel carriers and Tigers the division was redesignated Panzergrenadier Division Großdeutschland (Armored Infantry Division Grossdeutschland), though in reality it now had more armoured vehicles than most full-strength panzer divisions.

1943–1945

The newly re-equipped division was subordinated to the XXXXVIII Panzer Corps, part of Fourth Panzer Army, and took part in the Battle of Kursk. During the buildup period, a brigade of two battalions was equipped with the new Panther tanks, which were plagued by technical problems, suffering from engine fires and mechanical breakdowns before reaching the battlefield. By 7 July, the division had only 80 of its 300 tanks still fit for combat. After the Kursk offensive was cancelled, the division was transferred back to Army Group Center, and resumed its role as a mobile reserve. The Tiger I tank company was expanded to a battalion, becoming the III. Battalion of the Panzer Regiment. Großdeutschland saw heavy fighting around Karachev before being transferred back to XLVIII Panzer Corps in late August. For the rest of 1943, Großdeutschland retreated across Ukraine, and in 1944 into Romania, where it took part in the First Battle of Târgu Frumos.

In early August, the division was transferred to East Prussia from Army Group South Ukraine. Over the next months, Großdeutschland was involved in heavy fighting in both East Prussia, including a counter-attack on Wilkowischken and the Baltic States, suffering high casualties in both men and materiel. The division was nearly destroyed during the battles in the Memel bridgehead.

In November 1944, while the division and several attached units were redesignated as  Panzerkorps Großdeutschland. By March 1945, the Panzer Grenadier Division Großdeutschland had been reduced to around 4,000 men after the Battle of Memel. By 25 April 1945, the division was engaged in heavy fighting in the battles around Pillau. Eight hundred men of the division were evacuated on ferries via the Baltic Sea and surrendered to British forces in Schleswig-Holstein on May 9. The rest were either killed or captured during the fighting in Pillau or surrendered to Soviet forces on May 9 on the Vistula spit.

War crimes
During the campaign in France, Großdeutschland carried out racially motivated murders of hundreds of captured black African members of the French army, which fell into the hands of the infantry regiment. The soldiers of Großdeutschland murdered captured blacks on account of their race, which they believed to merit their separation from white soldiers, and then their execution. For example, on June 10, 1940, at least 150 captured black soldiers were separated and murdered by Großdeutschland in the Erquinvillers area. On 19 and 20 June 1940, the regiment's soldiers carried out a series of massacres of captured blacks in the Chasselay area, in which the regiment together with the SS division 3rd SS Panzer Division Totenkopf murdered about 100 black soldiers for racial reasons.

Reprisals

The book German Army and Genocide mentions the following incident, from the invasion of Yugoslavia:

Part of the photographic presentation for the book includes a photo where the Großdeutschland cuff title on the officer is clearly visible. The subject of Grossdeutschland's complicity in many subsequent war crimes in Russia and Ukraine, was the subject of the book by Omer Bartov The Eastern Front, 1941–45, German Troops, and the Barbarization of Warfare (1986).

Under existing international law at the time, reprisals were permitted though the Allied nations and Nazi Germany had differing interpretations of the law. In postwar war crimes trials, reprisal killings were deemed to be illegal, a conclusion enshrined in international law by the United Nations.

Organization 
Structure of the division:

 Headquarters
 Grossdeutschland Reconnaissance Battalion
 Grossdeutschland Panzer Regiment
 Grossdeutschland Panzergrenadier Regiment
 Grossdeutschland Fusilier Regiment
 Grossdeutschland Engineer Battalion
 Grossdeutschland Artillery Regiment
 Grossdeutschland Tank Destroyer Battalion
 Grossdeutschland Army Anti-Aircraft Battalion
 Grossdeutschland Assault Gun Battalion
 Grossdeutschland Signal Battalion
 Grossdeutschland Divisional Supply Group

Commanders
Infantry Regiment Grossdeutschland
 Oberstleutnant , July 1939 – February 1940
 Oberstleutnant Gerhard Graf von Schwerin, February 1940 – March 1940
 Oberst Wilhelm-Hunold von Stockhausen, March 1940 – August 1941
 Oberst Walter Hörnlein, August 1941 – April 1942

Infantry/Panzergrenadier Division Grossdeutschland
 Generalmajor Walter Hörnlein - 1 April 1942 – 3 April 1943
 Generalleutnant Hermann Balck - 3 April - 30 June 1943
 Generalleutnant Walter Hörnlein - 30 June 1943 - 1 February 1944
 Generalleutnant Hasso von Manteuffel - 1 February 1944 – August 1944
 Generalmajor Karl Lorenz - 1 September 1944 - 7 May 1945

See also
 Guy Sajer

References

Notes

Citations

Bibliography

Further reading
 

German panzergrenadier divisions
Military units and formations established in 1942
Military units and formations disestablished in 1945